Björn Borg was the defending champion, but did not participate this year.

Gene Mayer won the title, defeating Sandy Mayer 6–4, 6–2 in the final.

Seeds

  Jimmy Connors (semifinals)
  Roscoe Tanner (second round, withdrew)
  Gene Mayer (champion)
  Yannick Noah (third round)
  Brian Gottfried (second round)
  Johan Kriek (second round)
  Harold Solomon (first round)
  Stan Smith (second round)
  Tomáš Šmíd (second round)
  Fritz Buehning (third round, withdrew)
  Sandy Mayer (final)
  Rolf Gehring (second round)
  Tim Mayotte (third round)
  Robert Lutz (second round)
  Kevin Curren (second round)
  Carlos Kirmayr (second round)

Draw

Finals

Top half

Section 1

Section 2

Bottom half

Section 3

Section 4

External links
 ATP tournament draws
 ITF tournament draws

Stockholm Open
1981 Grand Prix (tennis)